Paradesi is a 2007 Indian Malayalam-language drama film written and directed by P. T. Kunju Muhammed. It was produced by Antony Perumbavoor under the company Aashirvad Cinemas. Mohanlal plays Valiyakaththu Moosa, in three stages of his life, between the ages of 35 and 80. It also features Swetha Menon, Lakshmi Gopalaswamy, Padmapriya Janakiraman, Jagathy Sreekumar, and Siddique in significant roles.

The film portrays the issue of Indian citizens who left the country before the partition of India in search of job, mostly to Arabia, and happened to reach Pakistan, and then when returned to the homeland, happened to be holding a Pakistani passport, and now is forced by the Indian authorities to leave the nation to Pakistan, which even the Pakistani authorities won't allow.

Plot

Valiyakaththu Moosa is an Indian Muslim who moves from the Malabar region of Kerala, India to Karachi, Pakistan during the British Raj in search of a job. Post-partition, he returns from Pakistan and settles down in Malappuram, Kerala. This man, who lives as a true Indian, doesn't get his Indian passport and thus an Indian identity in the official sense, even after 50 years of Independence.

Indian police harass him and his neighbours in a similar situation as Pakistani spies. The film has Mohanlal playing the character in three stages of his life, between the ages of 35 and 80

Cast

Production
The film was produced by Antony Perumbavoor under the banner of Aashirvad Cinemas. The locations of the film included Ottappalam in Kerala and Rajasthan.

Music
The music was composed by Ramesh Narayan and Shahabaz Aman.

Release
The film was released on 24 October 2007.

Awards
National Film Awards
 National Film Award for Best Make-up Artist - Pattanam Rasheed

Kerala State Film Awards
 Best Actor - Mohanlal
 Best Story - P. T. Kunju Muhammed
 Best Makeup Artist - Pattanam Rasheed
 Special Jury Award - Jagathy Sreekumar
 Best Dubbing Artist - Hafsath, Zeenath

Filmfare Awards South
Best Actor - Mohanlal
Best Supporting Actress - Lakshmi Gopalaswami

References

External links
 

2000s Malayalam-language films
India–Pakistan relations in popular culture
Films that won the National Film Award for Best Make-up
Films set in Kerala
Films set in Karachi
Films set in the partition of India
Aashirvad Cinemas films
Films shot in Ottapalam